The 2002 Belgian Figure Skating Championships were the national championships of the 2001–02 figure skating season. Skaters competed in the disciplines of men's and ladies' singles.

Senior results

Men

Ladies

External links
 results

Belgian Figure Skating Championships
Belgian Figure Skating Championships, 2002